Christopher Noel Dorsey (born September 3, 1980), better known by his stage name B.G. (acronym for   Baby Gangsta), is an American rapper from New Orleans, Louisiana. He began his music career signing to Birdman's Cash Money Records in 1994 at the age of 13. Dorsey, alongside fellow rappers Lil Wayne, Juvenile and Turk, collectively formed the group, the Hot Boys in 1997. B.G. released several solo albums for Cash Money, including the platinum-selling Chopper City in the Ghetto in 1999. In 2001, he resigned from Cash Money Records and created his own label, Chopper City Records.

Dorsey has been incarcerated since 2009 on weapons and witness tampering charges.

Early life 
Dorsey was born on September 3, 1980, at Charity Hospital in New Orleans, Louisiana. He grew up in the Freret neighborhood of Uptown New Orleans, which is located in the 13th Ward. The Dorsey family lived in a shotgun house on the corner of Valence and Magnolia Street. When he was 12, his father was killed during an attempted robbery. He then began selling crack cocaine and hanging out on street corners with drug dealers. While attending middle school, he started rapping and eventually met with Bryan "Birdman" Williams (a.k.a. Baby) in a barbershop in 1993. Birdman and his brother "Slim" took Dorsey in, allowing him to  stay with them. They later signed him to Cash Money Records. At 15, he dropped out of high school and began using heroin but still focused on making music.

Career 
He released the album Chopper City in 1996 and the albums It's All on U, Vol. 1 and Vol. 2 in 1997. He was also part of the group Hot Boys with other local rappers Lil Wayne, Juvenile, Turk, and Baby's nephew Derrick a.k.a. Bulletproof (who eventually left the group). The group's debut album, Get It How U Live!, was released in October 1997.

In 1998, Cash Money Records signed a deal with Universal Records, which released Chopper City in the Ghetto in April 1999. The album included the hit song "Bling Bling", which further popularized the hip-hop slang term "bling bling" describing shiny, expensive jewelry, automobiles, or other forms of opulence. The Oxford English Dictionary added "bling bling" in 2003. The Hot Boys' second album, Guerrilla Warfare, was released in July 1999 and reached No.5 on the Billboard 200 chart.

Checkmate (2000) was B.G.'s last album with Cash Money Records. In 2001, when B.G. left Cash Money Records, he claimed to have left the label over a financial dispute with owners Birdman and Ronald "Slim" Williams, which caused controversy at the time. He released his sixth studio album Livin' Legend on his own label, Chopper City Records.

He released Life After Cash Money in 2004, The Heart of tha Streetz, Vol. 1 in 2005, and The Heart of tha Streetz, Vol. 2 (I Am What I Am), which reached #6 on the Billboard 200, in 2006. With the Chopper City Boyz, he recorded We Got This in 2007 and Life in the Concrete Jungle in 2008. In 2009, the Hot Boys agreed to a reunion. This plan was later scrapped, though B.G. and Juvenile did appear briefly on stage at a Lil Wayne concert that June. B.G. released his tenth studio album, Too Hood 2 Be Hollywood, in December 2009 after many delays. It included the hit single "My Hood" which featured longtime friend Mannie Fresh. "My Hood" reached #70 on the U.S. R&B Charts.

In June 2010, B.G. released a collaborative mixtape with Baton Rouge rapper Lil Boosie titled "22504 (225504)", which is the combined area codes of their respective hometowns. A month later, B.G. released a solo mixtape titled Money Side, Murda Side where he introduces his newfound group, Chopper City Gorilla Gang (or simply CCGG). He released his street album titled HollyHood on October 5, 2010.

Legal issues 
On November 3, 2009, B.G. was arrested in New Orleans, Louisiana after police pulled over his Chevrolet Tahoe during a routine traffic stop. It is rumored that he was leaving the home of his girlfriend in Uptown New Orleans when he was stopped by the police in Eastern New Orleans. During a search of the vehicle, police found three guns, two of which were reported stolen. B.G. was booked into the Orleans Parish Jail on an illegal carrying of weapons charge. When B.G. appeared in court on November 5, his incarceration and bond information were unknown to the press at that time. On February 11, 2010, he appeared in court and entered a not guilty plea. On July 18, 2012, B.G. was sentenced to 14 years in a federal prison for gun possession and witness tampering.

Discography

Studio albums 

 Chopper City (1996)
 It's All on U, Vol. 1 (1997)
 It's All on U, Vol. 2 (1997)
 Chopper City in the Ghetto (1999)
 Checkmate (2000)
 Livin' Legend (2003)
 Life After Cash Money (2004)
 The Heart of tha Streetz, Vol. 1 (2005)
 The Heart of tha Streetz, Vol. 2 (I Am What I Am) (2006)
 Too Hood 2 Be Hollywood (2009)

Collaboration albums 
 True Story with Lil Wayne (1995)
 Get It How U Live! with Hot Boys (1997)
 Guerrilla Warfare with Hot Boys (1999)
 Baller Blockin' with Cash Money Millionaires (2000)
 Let 'Em Burn with Hot Boys (2003)
 We Got This with Chopper City Boyz (2007)
 Life in the Concrete Jungle with Chopper City Boyz (2008)
 225504 with Lil Boosie (2010)

See also 
 Hot Boys
 Chopper City Records
 Cash Money Records

References

External links 
Official website
Atlantic Records page

B.G. Interview, 05/07/09

1980 births
Living people
Male actors from New Orleans
American male film actors
African-American male rappers
American male rappers
American prisoners and detainees
Cashville Records artists
Rappers from New Orleans
Southern hip hop musicians
African-American male actors
Gangsta rappers
21st-century American rappers
21st-century American male musicians
21st-century African-American musicians
20th-century African-American people
Cash Money Millionaires members
Hot Boys members